Justin Hollander (born c. 1978) is an American professional baseball executive for the Seattle Mariners of Major League Baseball. He is the Mariners' general manager.

Hollander is from Dayton, Ohio. He earned a Bachelor of Science from Ohio State University in 2001 and his Juris Doctor from the University of San Diego in 2004.

Hollander took on a profession as a lawyer for four years, until he changed his career path to baseball. 

Hollander worked for the Los Angeles Angels for nine seasons. He was hired by the Seattle Mariners as their director of baseball operations in September 2016. He was promoted to assistant general manager in November 2018 and vice president and assistant general manager in February 2020. In October 2022, the Mariners promoted Hollander to general manager.

Hollander and his wife, Whitney, have two children.

References

Living people
1970s births
Seattle Mariners executives
Los Angeles Angels executives
Ohio State University alumni
University of San Diego School of Law alumni
Major League Baseball general managers